Rebecca Frith is an Australian actress.

Biography
Since graduating from the National Institute of Dramatic Art in 1987, Frith has appeared in a diversity of TV shows (Water Rats (TV series), G.P., A Country Practice, MDA). Firth gained international acclaim as the older of two sisters vying for the attentions of a lecherous DJ in Shirley Barrett's Caméra d'Or winning debut, Love Serenade, screening in Un Certain Regard at the 1996 Cannes Film Festival. For the role she was awarded the Leonardo da Vinci prize for Best Actress, Debut Performance by the Beaux Arts Society in New York.

In 2002 she received an Australian Film Institute award nomination 'Best Actress in a Supporting or Guest Role in a Television Drama' for her role in Secret Bridesmaids' Business.

Frith's extensive stage credits include The Sydney Theatre Company's The Crucible, Midsummer Night's Dream, title role in Romeo & Juliet, and The Rain Dancers.

Filmography
 SLiDe (4 episodes, 2011) .... Rebecca
 Corroboree (2007) .... Dr. Elsja
 Human Touch (2004) .... Desiree
 Through My Eyes (2004) (TV) .... Robertson
 A Man's Gotta Do (2004) .... Yvonne
 Violet Lives Upstairs (2003) .... Violet
 MDA .... Fran Griffin (3 episodes, 2003)
 Secret Bridesmaids' Business (2002) .... Angela
 Russian Doll (2001) .... Miriam
 A Wreck, a Tangle (2000) .... Rita
 The Missing (1999) .... Susan
 Strange Planet (1999) .... Amanda
 Water Rats .... Rebecca Solomon (1 episode, 1999)
 Me Myself I (1999) .... Terri
 Fetch (1998)
 Love Serenade (1996) .... Vicki-Ann Hurley
 G.P. .... Ruth Taylor (2 episodes, 1995)
 A Country Practice .... Denise Scott / ... (4 episodes, 1991–1993)
 Law of the Land (1993) TV series .... Alex Lentini (unknown episodes)

References

External links
 

Living people
Australian film actresses
Australian television actresses
National Institute of Dramatic Art alumni
Year of birth missing (living people)